Campus School is a co-ed school located in the university campus of Pantnagar district Udham Singh Nagar, previously district Nainital Uttarakhand. It was established in 1971 by the Sisters of Notre Dame at the invitation of Pantnagar University. The school, affiliated with the Central Board of Secondary Education, caters mostly to the children of people working in academic institutions in the Govind Ballabh Pant University of Agriculture & Technology. The first batch of High School passed out in 1977 and 10+2 in 1986. Many students of the school have gone on to elite institutions such as IITs, IIMs, NITIE( National Institute of Industrial Engineering), IRMA, AIIMS (Delhi), AFMC (Pune), NDA/CDS, JIPMER, Maulana Azad Medical College (MAMC), etc. and have also gone abroad through GRE/TOEFL for higher education. The school is represented in various national and international quiz competitions like Bournvita Quiz Contest and its students have also won many scholarships such as NTSE, Mathematics Olympiad, etc. Also, there are well-developed science practical labs and 2-3 practicals take place weekly. The school has a double storied building and a huge playground. A new Multi-Purpose Hall has been constructed and this was established on 2 October 2014. The alumni of the school are based across the world and doing well professionally and personally. They are strong pillars of the community in their respective regions and contribute constructively to society.

A paper factory in the nearby town of Lalkuan also sends quite a few children to this school. The school also caters to children from nearby towns such as Rudrapur, Kichcha, Baheri, Nagla, Lalkuan, and Haldwani.

The first principal of the school was Sr Laurette, who had come down from Ohio, US. She was followed by Sr Mary Vimala and Sr Mary Vijaya. The Sisters of Notre Dame handed over administrative control of the school to Joseph John in 1984. The school currently has Dr. B.C. Pathak as principal.

School Song 

Here is the Campus School's song sung often at events and assembly:

O Join together campus students one and all

To build a new and bright tomorrow for our land

With study play and earnest work we'll do our best

Let us together now march forward hand in hand.

Amidst the flowers fruit, and fields of Pantnagar

We think and learn and search and serve each other

With Courage and grace the honour of our school uphold

We will be makers of this school destiny.

In campus school we are one happy family

No matter poor or rich we work in unity

By knowledge gained we dare to shape our destiny

We will be makers of our country's history.

All the challenges that comes we dare to face

Our love and care we'd like to share with every race

From day to day we probe into life's mystery

We will be makers of our country's history

References

High schools and secondary schools in Uttarakhand
Education in Udham Singh Nagar district
Pantnagar
Educational institutions established in 1971
1971 establishments in Uttar Pradesh